Mike Kelly (born January 26, 1948) is a former American football coach.  He was the head football coach at the University of Dayton from 1981 to 2007.  In 27 years as the head coach at Dayton, he compiled a record of 246–54–1.  He led the Dayton Flyers to the NCAA Division III Football Championship in 1989 and appearances in the title game three other times, in 1981, 1987, and 1991.  Kelly ranks among the top 25 college football coaches of all time in winning percentage (.819).  Among coaches with at least 25 years of experience, he has the fifth best winning percentage of all time.

Biography
Kelly is a graduate of Milton-Union High School in West Milton, Ohio, and Manchester University in North Manchester, Indiana.  He played both quarterback for the football team and catcher for the baseball team at Manchester University.  He received a bachelor's degree in physical education and health from Manchester University.

Kelly began his coaching career as a high school football coach.  He coached at the high school level from 1970 to 1974 while earning a master's degree in physical education from Ball State University.  From 1975 to 1976, he was an assistant coach at Hanover College in Hanover, Indiana.  He joined the coaching staff at the University of Dayton in 1977 as the defensive coordinator under head coach Rick Carter.

After four years as the defensive coordinator, Kelly took over as head coach of the Dayton Flyers football team in 1981.  He later recalled the day he learned that he had been selected: "The day I was informed that I would be the head football coach, I remember walking out of St. Mary's Hall and looking up at the chapel, and it was overwhelming to think that, golly, I'm the new head football coach at the University of Dayton."

Kelly remained Dayton's head football coach for 27 years and compiled a record of 246–54–1.  Kelly is among the top 25 college football coaches of all time in terms of both winning percentage and wins.  As of 2008, he ranked 21st among all college football coaches in all divisions with an .819 winning percentage over 27 seasons. Among coaches with at least 25 years of experience, Kelly's winning percentage of .819 ranks fourth best all time, trailing only Florida A&M's Jake Gaither (.844), Nebraska's Tom Osborne (.836) and Michigan's Fielding H. Yost (.828).

In total wins, Kelly ranks 20th all time with 246.  He was the second fastest coach in NCAA history to reach 200 wins.  Kelly accomplished the feat in 242 games—second only to Jake Gaither who reached the 200-win level in 240 games.

He led Dayton to three national championships—the NCAA Division III national championship in 1989 and NCAA Mid-Major national championships in 2002 and 2007.  In 2007, Kelly's last as head coach, his team compiled an 11-1 record, won the Gridiron Classic and was crowned NCAA FCS Mid-Major national champions. He coached 44 Academic All-Americans and 84 first team All-Americans in his 27 years as Dayton's head coach.

Kelly was frequently considered for coaching positions at larger schools, including Yale, Dartmouth, Columbia, and Penn, but opted to stay at Dayton.  In 1996, he described his motivation for staying at Dayton, "There is a very basic reason why I haven't put a great deal of effort in other jobs.  I just love it here. I think we're accepted and respected in the community. Those things are all very valuable in your life. You want to feel wanted - that's pretty basic, I think - and we've always felt that."  He also noted that he enjoyed working with non-scholarship athletes who were playing for the love of the game: "It's a blast.  It's a lot of fun to deal with those kind of people. They want to have fun, and they're gonna work hard, but every one of them is out there because they want to be. I look forward to going to practice. They're wide-eyed. (They're saying) 'Teach me something coach.'"

Kelly was selected six times as the Coach of the Year in the Pioneer Football League and was honored seven times as the national Coach of the Year.  Dayton played in NCAA Division III for Kelly's first 12 seasons as head coach and went to the Division III playoffs eight times.  For his last 15 seasons, Dayton played in the NCAA Division I-AA non-scholarship division.

Kelly was inducted into the University of Dayton Athletic Hall of Fame in February 2008.

On July 16, 2011, Coach Kelly was inducted into the National Football Foundation’s College Football Hall of Fame. The ceremony was co-hosted by one of Coach Kelly's former players and former Super Bowl Champion head coach, Jon Gruden.

He is married to Jeanne Kelly, and they have two daughters, Jodie Beth and Nikki.

Head coaching record

See also
 List of college football coaches with 200 wins

References

External links
 

1948 births
Living people
American football quarterbacks
Baseball catchers
Dayton Flyers football coaches
Hanover Panthers football coaches
Manchester Spartans baseball players
Manchester Spartans football players
High school football coaches in Indiana
College Football Hall of Fame inductees
People from West Milton, Ohio
Coaches of American football from Ohio
Players of American football from Ohio
Baseball players from Ohio